Silviu may refer to:

Silviu Bălace (born 1978), Romanian football player
Silviu Berejan (1927–2007), Bessarabian writer from Moldova and member of the Academy of Sciences of Moldova
Silviu Bindea (1912–1992), Romanian football player
Silviu Brucan (1916–2006), Romanian communist politician
Silviu Casandra (born 1975), Romanian race walker
Silviu Florea (born 1977), Romanian rugby union footballer
Silviu Ilie (born 1988), Romanian football player
Silviu Izvoranu (born 1982), Romanian football player
Silviu Lung (born 1956), retired Romanian football goalkeeper
Silviu Lung Jr. (born 1989), Romanian football player
Silviu Manea (born 1983), Romanian ski mountaineer
Silviu Ploeşteanu (1913–1969), Romanian footballer and manager
Silviu Prigoană (born 1963), Romanian businessman and politician
Silviu Simioncencu (born 1975), Romanian sprint canoeist and three-time world champion in the Canadian canoe events
Silviu Simoncenco, Romanian sprint canoeist who has competed since 2007
Ioan Silviu Suciu (born 1977), retired Romanian artistic gymnast
George Silviu (1901–1971), Romanian writer

See also
Silvius (disambiguation)

Romanian masculine given names